Massing is a surname. Notable people with the surname include:

 Benjamin Massing (1962-2017), Cameroonian footballer
 Hede Massing (1900-1981), Austrian actress
 Michael Massing (21st century), American essayist
 Paul Massing (1902-1979), German sociologist
 Rune Massing (born 1980), Dutch badminton player